Rugal may refer to:

 Rugal folds, ridges produced by folding of the wall of an organ
 Rugal Bernstein, a video game character created by SNK
 Rugal (TV series), a 2020 South Korean television series